Sherman is an unincorporated community semi ghost town in Elko County, Nevada in the United States.

History
The history of Sherman is linked with Valentine Walter family's history. Valentine and his wife came from Eureka and had homesteaded in Sherman Creek by 1876. The couple had twelve children. Because he had so many children, Walter had the permission to open and to create his own school district on May 9, 1886. Sherma was a stagecoach stop. The Walthers provided food and lodging. Walther had the finest grove in Nevada at that time. In this orchard he raised cherries, plums, apricots, apples (250 apple trees). Unhappily, Mrs Walther died in June 1895 and Valentine was left alone to raise 11 children (one child had died at two months of age). In 1902, he and a friend began to build a huge nine-room log home which took 2 years to finish. In 1922, Walther sold his ranch and retired to Elko, where he died in 1933. Nowadays, Sherman is a private property behind a gate and should not be entered without permission, but many of the buildings of early times remain, such as a blacksmith shop and the school.

Notes

Unincorporated communities in Nevada
Ghost towns in Elko County, Nevada
Elko, Nevada micropolitan area
Ghost towns in Nevada
Unincorporated communities in Elko County, Nevada